John J. Reddington (born 1910 in Athlone) was an Irish clergyman and bishop for the Roman Catholic Diocese of Jos.

Reddington was received as a member of the Society of African Missions on 2 July 1930 and ordained a priest in St. Colman's Cathedral, Newry, by Bishop Edward Mulhern of Dromore diocese, on 10 June 1934.

He was appointed Bishop of Jos in 1954, a post he resigned in 1974.

From November 1974 until June 1975 Reddington was the chaplain at St. Bernard's Priory, Warton, in England. In December 1975, suffering from diabetes, he retired to the Sacred Heart nursing home in Raheny, Dublin, where he died in 1994.

References 

1910 births
1994 deaths
Roman Catholic bishops of Jos
20th-century Irish bishops
Irish expatriate Catholic bishops